Ryan Shelton is an Australian comedian, actor, radio presenter, television personality, host and writer.

Biography 
He attended St Leonards College for some of his schooling, where he met Hamish Blake. He started his media career in Melbourne's community access media scene, hosting and producing shows for RMIT University's student television company RMITV, for Channel 31, and its campus radio station SYN. Shelton plays mixed netball.

Television
With Hamish Blake and Andy Lee, he wrote and co-starred in Hamish & Andy (2004) and Real Stories (2006). He was also a co-writer of Chris Lilley's award-winning We Can Be Heroes: Finding The Australian of the Year (2005). In 2007, he became a regular cast member on television programme Rove. His signature segment in 2007 was called Rydeas (pronounced "rye-deers" a portmanteau of "Ryan" & "ideas"). In 2008 he started a new segment called Investigationing (a neologism) and in 2009 introduced a segment called "Philosophisationing".

Shelton has also appeared on the improvisational comedy Thank God You're Here produced by the award-winning Working Dog Productions.

He has also appeared on Hamish and Andy's Gap Year and has his own segment "100 second New York lesson'd". He appeared from the second episode onwards. Shelton also appeared briefly on TwentySomething.

In 2017, Shelton co-produced True Story with Hamish & Andy. He starred in the fourth episode, playing the part of storyteller Emidio, a teacher in his first year of the job.

Radio
He was an occasional co-host on the radio show Get This. He also appeared on Red Hot Go, a late night radio show on FOX FM in Melbourne on Monday nights. In December 2007, Shelton presented the Summer Fling breakfast show across the Austereo Today Network with Jules Lund and Tamsyn Lewis. In February 2008, he joined Nova FM to present a Saturday morning breakfast program Ryan & Monty with Katie Dimond ('Monty'). It aired from 10 am to 12 pm. From January 2009 to 2010 he hosted the Nova FM drive time slot on Ryan, Monty & Wippa between 4-6pm weekdays with Katie Dimond (aka Monty) and Michael "Wippa" Wipfli. Lachy Hulme is doing many of the voiceovers for the show.

Podcasts
In 2011, Shelton released a series of one-minute episodes for a podcast called For One Minute Only, in which he sardonically and ironically lays waste to the rumour that he would not be releasing a series of weekly podcasts. In addition to this tongue-in-cheek and short-lived podcast, Shelton has made guest appearances on several other podcasts, including The Hamish & Andy Show, Little Dum Dum Club, Josh Speaking, and The Binge Podcast. He co-hosts The Imperfects podcast as part of The Resilience Project with Hugh van Cuylenburg.

References

External links 
 

Living people
Australian radio personalities
Comedians from Melbourne
Australian male comedians
RMITV alumni
Year of birth missing (living people)